is a Japanese former sumo wrestler from Aomori, Aomori Prefecture. He made his professional debut in January 1999. At the age of 32, he was promoted to the top makuuchi division in the November 2008 tournament. His highest rank was maegashira 3. He is now a sumo coach.

Career
Bushuyama was a contemporary of Wakanosato and Takamisakari, both also from Aomori. He was a member of the sumo club at Daito Bunka University, and reached the round of 16 in the 1998 All Japan Sumo Championship. As his club did not have many members, they regularly trained at Musashigawa stable, and this was the heya he joined upon entering the professional ranks. He made his debut in the same tournament as Asashōryū. He was given special dispensation to begin his career in the third highest makushita division because of his achievements in amateur sumo, but in 2001 fell to the jonidan division because of an elbow injury.  He reached the second highest jūryō division in September 2003, the first member of his university to attain sekitori status.

He won the  division championship for the first time in July 2008, with a 12–3 record. He followed up with a 10–5 score in September. In November 2008, he was finally promoted to the top division. It had taken him 59 tournaments to win promotion to the top division from his debut, which at the time was the longest of any former collegiate champion (this dubious honor is now held by Tsurugidake). At 32 years and five months he was also the fourth oldest wrestler to make his top division debut since the end of World War II.

Bushuyama scored eight wins in his top division debut and was promoted to maegashira 6 for the January 2009 tournament. However, a very disappointing 2–13 record there meant he was demoted back to the jūryō division for the March 2009 tournament. He scored 8–7 there, enough for an immediate top division return. He recovered from 1–5 down in May to score 9–6 at  15. In the September tournament he produced his best top division score of 10–5, narrowly failing to win a special prize after being beaten on the final day. He was promoted to his highest rank of  3 for November 2009. He defeated  Kotomitsuki in this tournament, but recorded a make-koshi score of 6–9. In January 2010 he produced a poor 2–13 record, the same score from the same rank as the previous Hatsu basho in 2009. However, on this occasion he remained in the top division for the following tournament, albeit at the very lowest rank of  West. He lost his top division status after scoring only 4–11 in March, but won his second  championship with an 11–4 record in May and secured an immediate return to makuuchi. He was demoted to juryo again after the November 2010 tournament, and lost  status altogether after the May 2012 tournament, never to regain it.

Retirement from sumo

Bushuyama announced his retirement after the January 2013 . He became an elder of the Japan Sumo Association under the name Onogawa Oyakata. His danpatsu-shiki or official retirement ceremony was held in the Ryogoku Kokugikan October 2013, with around 300 guests and his stablemaster, former  Mienoumi, making the final cut of his topknot. He works as a coach at his old stable, now renamed Fujishima stable. In January 2016 he switched to the Kiyomigata elder name (owned by active wrestler Tochiozan.) In May 2020 he switched to the Kasugayama kabu (owned by Ikioi). In May 2021 he acquired the Matsuchiyama name following the retirement of the former Banryūyama.

Fighting style

Career record

See also
Glossary of sumo terms
List of sumo tournament second division champions
List of past sumo wrestlers
List of sumo elders

References

External links

1976 births
Living people
Japanese sumo wrestlers
People from Aomori (city)
Sumo people from Aomori Prefecture